Culver City High School is the main public high school of the Culver City Unified School District (CCUSD) in Culver City, California. It was established in 1951. The school's colors are blue and silver, and the mascot is the centaur. As of 2021, its enrollment was roughly 2,000. Culver City High School is recognized as a California Distinguished School, earning the honor in 2005. The Robert Frost Auditorium is located within the school grounds of Culver City High School.

History
In the 2022-2023 school year the administration ended high school classes with the classification "honors", a move that sparked controversy in the district.

Notable alumni

 Haji Wright - American professional soccer player
 Kelvin Atkinson – Nevada State Assemblyman
 Ben Brode - Designer of Hearthstone and MARVEL SNAP
 Derrick Deese – San Francisco 49ers and Tampa Bay Buccaneers
 Joe Faust – Olympic high jumper, aviation publisher, renewable energy publisher
 Rocky George – Suicidal Tendencies guitarist
 Darrin Jackson of the Chicago Cubs
 Carnell Lake of the Pittsburgh Steelers, Jacksonville Jaguars, and Baltimore Ravens
 Billy Parks of the San Diego Chargers, Dallas Cowboys, and Houston Oilers
 Karl Paymah of the Denver Broncos, Minnesota Vikings, and San Francisco 49ers
 Ryan Sherriff – Philadelphia Phillies Baseball player
 Pepi Sonuga – Actress
 Robert Trujillo – Metallica bassist
 Kurt Alexander - "Big Boy" Nationally Syndicated American Radio Host.
 Lauren Reynolds - Investigative Reporter KGTV 10 News, San Diego

References

External links
 Culver City High School
 CCHS's Academy of Visual and Performing Arts

High schools in Los Angeles County, California
Educational institutions established in 1951
Buildings and structures in Culver City, California
Public high schools in California
1951 establishments in California